Róbert Pukalovič (born October 28, 1960) is a retired Slovak ice hockey defenceman and is now a head coach of the MHC Martin in the Slovak Extraliga. He has a son named Róbert who plays also for MHC Martin.

Playing career
He played for HC Slovan Bratislava, HK Dukla Trenčín, HKm Zvolen and HK Nitra in Slovakia and for KalPa in the Finnish SM-liiga. He participated at the 1997 World Ice Hockey Championships for Slovakia, recording 1 point for assist.

Career statistics

External links

1960 births
Czechoslovak ice hockey defencemen
HK Dukla Trenčín players
HC Slovan Bratislava players
HK Nitra players
HKM Zvolen players
KalPa players
Living people
Ice hockey people from Bratislava
Slovak ice hockey coaches
Slovak ice hockey defencemen
Slovak expatriate ice hockey players in Finland
Czechoslovak expatriate sportspeople in Finland
Czechoslovak expatriate ice hockey people